MBBA may refer to:

N-(4-Methoxybenzylidene)-4-butylaniline, an organic compound
State of New York Municipal Bond Bank Agency, a New York State public-benefit corporation
Metropolitan Black Bar Association, association of African-American attorneys